The Svingerud Runestone is a sandstone object featuring Elder Futhark inscriptions found in a grave west of Oslo, Norway. Radiocarbon dating indicates that the grave and the runestone date to between 1 and 250 CE, during the Roman Iron Age, making it the oldest datable runestone known in the world, and potentially the oldest known runic inscription. The discovery is additionally notable for the content of its inscriptions.

Discovery and context
Archaeologists from the Museum of Cultural History, University of Oslo, discovered the stone in the autumn of 2021 while investigating a gravefield near Tyrifjorden. The runes, recording words of an early form of the Proto-Norse language (a northern development of Proto-Germanic), were carved, possibly with the tip of a needle or a knife, in a block of reddish-brown Ringerike sandstone measuring 31x32 cm (12.2 in by 12.6 in).

Runologist Kristel Zilmer, Professor of Written Culture and Iconography at the Museum of Cultural History, worked on interpreting the inscriptions on the rune stone throughout 2022. Zilmer said, "Having such a runic find fall into our lap is a unique experience and the dream of all runologists. For me, this is a highlight, because it is a unique find that differs from other preserved rune stones."

The stone is named after the site where it was found—Svingerud, Norway—and has generally been referred to as Svingerudsteinen ('the Svingerud Stone') to date.

Inscriptions
The first three runes of the runic alphabet, ᚠ (f), ᚢ (u) and ᚦ (th), are found in one place on the stone, making this the earliest known occurrence of this sequence.

Eight runes are more legible than its other inscriptions; transliterated into Roman letters they spell either idiberug or idiberun. According to Zilmer, "The text may refer to a woman called Idibera and the inscription could mean 'For Idibera'. Other possibilities are that idiberug is the rendering of a name such as Idibergu, or perhaps the kin name Idiberung. And there are other possible interpretations – as common with early runic inscriptions."

Exhibition
The University of Oslo has placed the stone on public exhibition from January 2023 until late February 2023.

See also
 Einang stone, another ancient runestone from Norway which has previously been called one of the oldest
 Meldorf fibula, a metal fibula found in Schleswig-Holstein that features rune-like writing, dated to around 50 CE
 Negau helmet, one helmet, known as Negau-B and dated to 300-350 BCE, features the oldest known writing in a Germanic language
 Vimose comb, another candidate for the earliest known runic inscription, a wooden comb found deposited in a bog in Denmark and dated to about 150 CE

Notes

Sources
 Olsen, Jan M. 2023. "Norway archaeologists find 'world’s oldest runestone'". AP News. January 17, 2023.
 University of Oslo. 2023. "The world's oldest runestone". Historical Museum. Undated.
 Gulliksen, Øivind  Found the world's oldest rune stone Museum of Cultural History. Oslo. January 17, 2023.
 Staff World’s oldest runestone found in Norway, archaeologists say January 17, 2023. AP in Copenhagen.

1st-century inscriptions
2nd-century inscriptions
3rd-century inscriptions
2021 archaeological discoveries
Archaeological discoveries in Norway
Elder Futhark inscriptions
Runestones in Norway